Batkanu is a village and seat of the chiefdom of Libeisaygahun in Bombali District in the Northern Province of Sierra Leone.

Geographic facts
Latitude: 9.0833,
Longitude: -12.4167,
Elevation: .

Climate
Batkanu's climate is relatively warm, with summer temperatures ranging from 20 degrees Celsius to 30 degrees Celsius (68 to 86 °F).
Batkanu has cloud coverage for the majority of the year and typically has little precipitation.

Images
http://maps.fallingrain.com/perl/map.cgi?kind=illum&scale=-5&x=480&y=360&xcenter=-12.4167&ycenter=9.0833&lat=9.0833&long=-12.4167&name=Batkanu&c=

References

Villages in Sierra Leone
Northern Province, Sierra Leone